This article displays the rosters for the participating teams at the 2013 FIBA Africa Club Championship.

Al-Ahly Benghazi

Club Sportif Constantinois

Étoile Sportive du Sahel

Ferroviário da Beira

Kano Pillars

LPRC Oilers

Malabo Kings

Primeiro de Agosto

Recreativo do Libolo

Sporting Club Alexandria

Tali BB

Urunani

References

External links
 2013 FIBA Africa Champions Cup Participating Teams

FIBA Africa Clubs Champions Cup squads
Basketball teams in Africa
FIBA